Kuokkala may refer to:

Finland 
 Kuokkala, Jyväskylä, a ward in Jyväskylä, Finland
 Kuokkala (district of Jyväskylä), a district within the ward
 Kuokkala, Lempäälä, a neighbourhood in Lempäälä, Finland

Russia 
 Repino, a municipal settlement in Saint Petersburg, Russia; formerly known as Kuokkala (when it was in Finland)